Salar de Arizaro ("Arizaro" comes from Atacameno  "crow", "condor" and , , "accommodation", "place where something is common".) is a large salt flat of the Andes in north-western Argentina.
It is located between the villages of Tolar Grande and Caipe and near Mina La Casualidad, in Los Andes Department, Salta Province.

Overview

Located in the central-western area of the Puna de Atacama, it covers an area of 1,600 km2. Per extension, the Salar de Arizaro is the 6th largest salt flat in the World and the 2nd largest in Argentina after the Salinas Grandes.

The salar area is mined for metallic and non-metallic resources, as it is rich in   salt, marble, iron, copper and onyx.

The nearest salt flats are the ones of Antofalla, Hombre Muerto (both in north of Catamarca Province), Pocitos (in the east) and the Salinas Grandes of Jujuy and Salta provinces.

The Salar de Arizaro is crossed in the middle by the Salta–Antofagasta railway and by the Provincial Route 27 (part of the former RN 59). A particular characteristic of it is a conical hill named Cerro Cono (or Cono de Arita), a sandstone-formation.

See also

Atacama Desert
Salar de Uyuni
Salar de Atacama

Literature
Gonzalo Monterroso: Touring Argentina - Salta. 1999, 
R. N. Alonso, J. G. Viramonte: Geología y Metalogenia de la Puna. Estudios geol. 43:393-407 (1987)

References

External links

 Salar de Arizaro on Salta Province website

Arizaro
Arizaro
Landforms of Salta Province
Puna de Atacama